

The Armenian gull (Larus armenicus) is a large gull found in the Caucasus and the Middle East. It was formerly classified as a subspecies of the European herring gull (L. argentatus), but is now generally considered to be a separate species, although BirdLife International lumps it with the yellow-legged gull (L. michahellis).

Description
The Armenian gull is a fairly large gull species, though it is on average the smallest of the "herring gull" complex. They are superficially similar to yellow-legged gulls but are slightly smaller with a slightly darker grey back and dark eyes. The area of black on the wingtips is more extensive with smaller white spots. The bill is short with a distinctive black band just before the tip. First-winter birds are mainly brown. They have a whitish rump, pale inner primary feathers, and a narrow, sharply-defined black band on the tail. Although their ranges do not overlap, with its darkish mantle, both black and red near the tip of its bill and a dark eye, the Armenian gull bears a remarkable resemblance to the California gull (L. californicus) of North America.

Distribution and habitat
The Armenian gull nests beside mountain lakes in Georgia, Armenia, Turkey, and western Iran. The largest colonies are at Lake Sevan and Lake Arpi in Armenia. It is a partial migrant, with many birds wintering on the coasts of Turkey, Lebanon, and Israel. Smaller numbers reach Cyprus, Egypt, and the Persian Gulf.

Breeding
The nest is a mound of vegetation built on the ground on an island or the lakeshore. Three eggs are laid, mainly in late April. The nesting colonies are very dense with nests close together and territorial conflicts are common.

Gallery

References

Bibliography
 Alan Harris, Hadoram Shirihai & David Christie (1996) The Macmillan Birder's Guide to European and Middle Eastern Birds, Macmillan, London.
 D.W. Snow & C.M. Perrins (1998) The Birds of the Western Palearctic, Concise Edition (Vol. 1),   Oxford University Press, Oxford.
 M.S. Adamian & D. Klem, Jr. (1997) A Field Guide to Birds of Armenia. American University of Armenia,

External links

 Armenian gull photos by Rudy Offerein
 Armenian Gull photos by Martin Reid

Armenian gull
Birds of Armenia
Birds of Western Asia
Armenian gull
Armenian gull